Arthur "Art" E. Kirkendoll (born November 3, 1951) is an American politician and former Democratic member of the West Virginia Senate. He represented District 7 from November 14, 2011, when West Virginia Governor Earl Ray Tomblin appointed him to fill the vacancy caused by Tomblin's resignation from the seat in order to assume the position of governor, until January 7, 2017. He was defeated for reelection in the 2016 primary election by Richard Ojeda.

Education
Kirkendoll attended Marshall University.

Elections
2012 Kirkendoll was challenged by former state Delegate Sammy Dalton in the District 8 May 8, 2012 Democratic Primary, winning with 11,529 votes (64.2%), and was unopposed for the November 6, 2012 General election, winning with 25,955 votes.

References

External links
Official page at the West Virginia Legislature

Art Kirkendoll at Ballotpedia
Art Kirkendoll at OpenSecrets

1951 births
Living people
Marshall University alumni
People from Logan, West Virginia
Democratic Party West Virginia state senators
21st-century American politicians